Two flags are in use in New Caledonia, an overseas territory of France. Up to 2010, the only flag used to represent New Caledonia was the flag of France, a tricolour featuring three vertical bands coloured blue (hoist side), white, and red known to English speakers as the French Tricolour or simply the Tricolour. 
However, in July 2010, the Congress of New Caledonia voted in favour of a wish to fly the Kanak flag of the independence movement FLNKS alongside the French Tricolour. The wish, legally non-binding, proved controversial. A majority of New Caledonian communes, but not all, now fly both flags, the rest flying only the French Tricolour.

Overview

In 2008, the government of New Caledonia debated the introduction of an official regional flag and anthem, as required by the Accord de Nouméa. A flag in fairly widespread unofficial use was the flag of the Kanak and Socialist National Liberation Front (FLNKS), a political party favoring independence for New Caledonia, thus a highly controversial emblem, and the French Tricolour would remain the only flag used for the next two years.

In July 2010, the Congress of New Caledonia voted in favour of a non legally binding wish (vœux) to fly the FLNKS flag alongside the French Tricolour in the territory. On 17 July 2010, French Prime Minister François Fillon took part in a ceremony in Nouméa where the FLNKS flag was hoisted alongside the French Tricolour. The coexistence with the pro independentist flag proved controversial, with the New Caledonian deputy to the National Assembly Gaël Yanno calling it "akin to raising the Palestinian flag over the Knesset". In the capital city Nouméa, the first raising of the FLNKS flag on the town hall happened without any ceremony, as the mayor refused to participate. The New Caledonian delegation to the Olympic Games used the combined flags for the first time in 2011. According to Philippe Gomès, then President of the Government of New Caledonia, "this flag was imposed on us. Is it representative of all communities? No, it's the flag of the Kanak, the flag of independence. Is it the choice of all? No, it's the choice of a lone man who chose to play along with the independence movement". Thus, the debate on finding a permanent official regional flag continued as the adoption of the Kanak flag proved controversial. Some New Caledonians argued for a completely new flag for New Caledonia, which would incorporate designs from both the French Tricolour and the Kanak flags. Such new flag would aim to promote a "common destiny" for ethnic Kanaks and ethnic French residents in New Caledonia.

FLNKS political flag
The FLNKS flag, first adopted by the party in 1980, is composed of three horizontal stripes of blue (Pantone 286c), red (Pantone 032c) and green (Pantone 347c) charged with a yellow (Pantone 102c) disc of a diameter two-thirds the height of the flag centered at a position of one-third the width of the flag, measured from the hoist side.  The disc is outlined in black and defaced with a vertical symbol, also black. It has the same color pattern as the Flag of Azerbaijan.

The blue symbolizes both the sky and more importantly the ocean surrounding New Caledonia.  The red symbolizes the blood shed by the Kanaks in their struggle for independence, socialism, and unity.  The green symbolizes the land itself and by extension the ancestors buried within it.  The yellow disc is a representation of the sun and the symbol upon it consists of a flèche faitière, a kind of arrow that adorns the roofs of Kanak houses thrust through tutut shells.

Provincial flags
New Caledonia is divided into three provinces, each with its own flag.

Other flags

See also

Emblem of New Caledonia

References

External links 

 

New Caledonia
New Caledonia
New Caledonian culture
New